Melton Viaduct is a railway viaduct south west of the city of Melton in Victoria, Australia. The  viaduct carries the Serviceton railway line over the valley of the Werribee River, now dammed to create Melton Reservoir. The girder and trestle viaduct was built in 1885 by Victorian Railways to establish a direct rail route between the cities of Melbourne and Ballarat.

The viaduct was listed on the Victorian Heritage Register in 2013.

References

External links

Transport in the City of Melton
Railway bridges in Victoria (Australia)
1885 establishments in Australia
Bridges completed in 1885
Trestle bridges
Heritage-listed buildings in Melbourne
Buildings and structures in the City of Melton